George J. Klein is a Canadian cardiologist and cardiac electrophysiologist, currently serving as Professor of Medicine at Western University in London, Ontario, Canada.

Biography
Klein graduated from the University of Toronto in 1972.

Research
Klein's research focused on cardiac arrhythmia, particularly Wolff–Parkinson–White syndrome, the surgical and ablative management of heart rhythm disturbances and the understanding of syncope.

See also
 Mark Josephson 
 Hein Wellens

References 

Cardiac electrophysiologists
Canadian cardiologists
Academic staff of the University of Western Ontario
University of Toronto alumni
Fellows of the Canadian Academy of Health Sciences
Year of birth missing (living people)
Living people